Hispo alboclypea is a species of jumping spider (family Salticidae). The species is endemic to Mahé Island and Silhouette Island of Seychelles.

References

Salticidae
Spiders of Africa
Fauna of Seychelles
Spiders described in 1981